Franz Bumann (24 October 1924 – 15 August 2005) was a Swiss alpine skier. He competed in the men's slalom at the 1952 Winter Olympics.

References

External links
 

1924 births
2005 deaths
Swiss male alpine skiers
Olympic alpine skiers of Switzerland
Alpine skiers at the 1952 Winter Olympics
Sportspeople from Valais
20th-century Swiss people